Hans Neuschäfer (23 November 19319 September 2020) was a German footballer who played as a midfielder for TuRu Düsseldorf, Viktoria Aschaffenburg, Fortuna Düsseldorf, FC Biel-Bienne and Viktoria Köln. He also played once for the Germany national team in 1956.

References

External links
 
 

1931 births
2020 deaths
German footballers
Association football midfielders
Germany international footballers
Fortuna Düsseldorf players
FC Biel-Bienne players
TuRU Düsseldorf players
Viktoria Aschaffenburg players
FC Viktoria Köln players
German football managers
FC Biel-Bienne managers
Footballers from Düsseldorf